"Broadway Bro Down" is the eleventh episode of the fifteenth season of the American animated television series South Park, and the 220th episode overall. It first aired on Comedy Central in the United States on October 26, 2011. In this episode, Randy Marsh discovers that Broadway musicals contain subtext that encourage women to give their partners oral sex, while Shelly starts dating a vegan boy named Larry Feegan.

The episode was written by Trey Parker and Robert Lopez as an uncredited writer, who previously worked with Parker and Matt Stone on their Broadway musical, The Book of Mormon. This episode is rated TV-MA-LS in the United States.

Plot
Randy Marsh hears from his male co-workers that taking women to Broadway shows sexually arouses them into performing oral sex. Randy takes Sharon to Denver to see the musical Wicked, but is confused and unimpressed with the lack of overt sexuality. He is informed by a fellow theatergoer at the theater's bar that women are aroused not by the production's explicit sexuality, but by its subtext. When Randy returns to the auditorium, he now hears the actors underhandedly referencing "blowjobs" frequently in the songs' lyrics. On the ride home Sharon performs fellatio on him, and as a result, Randy decides to take her to New York City to see all the Broadway shows, leaving Stan and Shelly with the Feegans, South Park's resident life-preserver wearing vegans. During their dinner with the Feegans, Shelly gets into a confrontation with Mr. Feegan over letting his son Larry decide for himself if he wants to be a vegan. Larry develops greater confidence as a result of this, develops a crush on Shelly, and abandons his life preserver.

Upon returning to South Park, Randy laments the fact that he does not live closer to a major theater venue like Broadway, as the Denver production of Wicked, to which he has already taken Sharon 23 times, will soon move to Seattle. He decides to produce a local play, though he discards subtext by naming it Splooge-Drenched Blowjob Queen, and not only makes the show about women giving oral sex, but includes direct commands to Sharon in it. This attracts the attention of Stephen Sondheim, Stephen Schwartz, Andrew Lloyd Webber, and Elton John. The four are depicted as hypermasculine, beer drinking heterosexuals who hang out at Hooters, and are called "Bros" (Sondheim and John are openly gay in real life). They chastise Randy for the overt use of sexuality in his play, explaining to him that the lack of any real subtext would expose the truth behind Broadway shows. Randy dismisses their criticisms, insisting that his play is filled with subtext, but after a "bro-down" with Sondheim in a parking lot, in which they confront each other with verbal challenges, Randy agrees to accept their assistance, and renames his play The Woman in White.

When Randy returns home and learns that Sharon gave Shelly two tickets to see Wicked with Larry, Randy is horrified, and races to Denver with Sharon, revealing to her the truth about Broadway shows, much to her own horror. Initially thrown out of the theater for being disruptive, Randy dons a Spider-Man costume and swings through the auditorium, knocking out several patrons and production personnel, before breaking open a water main, forcing the play into an intermission and fatally drowning now-preserverless Larry, much to Shelly's grief. Randy denies his involvement in Larry's death, claiming that Spider-Man killed Larry. Later, Randy apologizes to Sharon for taking her to the theater to get oral sex in return, though she expresses difficulty in faulting him for doing what all other men also do, pointing out that musicals must have value if they brought them closer together. When Sharon asks which show is coming to Denver next, an advertisement for The Book of Mormon plays, with the narrator quickly muttering, "You'll get a blowjob!"

Production
Trey Parker and Matt Stone had just finished working with composer Robert Lopez in the Broadway musical The Book of Mormon before this season of South Park commenced. During the collaboration, the duo offered Lopez a chance to come to their studio to create an episode with them and workshop ideas. He arrived on a Thursday at Halloween-time, so the notion of a generic Halloween-themed episode was tossed around. Broadway and musicals were never explicitly on the table until the idea of "trying to make Broadway cool for dudes" came up. They were anxious about the number of songs - albeit short ones - that they had to write. They kept on putting this off as they needed time to hash out the story. They ended up frantically writing songs on the following Tuesday. Trey and Matt thoroughly enjoyed the one-off experience and expressed an interest in collaborating with Lopez again, not necessarily in the context of a musical episode.

Reception
Ramsey Isler of IGN gave the episode a 7.5 out of 10, writing, "When it comes down to it, it's the one-liners and the strength of the A-plot that make this episode work. Had it not been for the annoying repetition and the near-useless B-plot, this would have been one of my favorites of the season so far. But the episode accomplishes the neat trick of poking fun at a topic while still expressing love for it, and that makes up for a lot". Ryan McGee of The A.V. Club graded the episode an A, stating, "The show has long featured the musical stylings of its co-creators, but rarely has that skill been deployed as effectively as tonight’s masterful half-hour ... It managed to be incredibly sweet while being ridiculously filthy. It mocked what it loved while never losing sight of that love in the process. In short, it was pure South Park." Eric Hochberger of TV Fanatic rated the episode 3/5 stars, commenting "There were definitely some fun theater references, including the most appropriate costume Randy could have grabbed to sabotage a play, Spider-Man, but was the one-note joke of the blow job really enough to sustain the full half hour of laughs? For me, not so much", and adding that the B plot "seemed to tie-in nicely with the Broadway adventure at the end, but it still felt undeveloped". Aly Semigram of Entertainment Weekly said "The episode could have just been a one-off about Broadway and worked just fine, but by bringing Spider-Man — a show that’s been out of the spotlight for a while now — into the mix, it felt somewhat outdated."

== References ==

External links
 "Broadway Bro Down" Full episode at South Park Studios
 

Broadway theatre
Cultural depictions of Elton John
Fellatio
South Park (season 15) episodes
Stephen Sondheim